The Lansdale Dukes were a minor league baseball team based in Lansdale, Pennsylvania. The Dukes played as members of the 1948 Class D level North Atlantic League, finishing last in their only season of minor league play. Lansdale finished the season with a 28–101 record, hosting home games at Weaver Field.

History 
Lansdale began minor league play in 1948, as the Dukes became members of the eight–team, Class D level North Atlantic League. Lansdale replaced the Kingston Dodgers franchise in the league. The Bloomingdale Troopers, Carbondale Pioneers, Mahanoy City Brewers, Nazareth Barons, Nyack Rockies, Peekskill Highlanders and Stroudsburg Poconos joined Lansdale in beginning league play on May1, 1948.

The Lansdale Dukes began minor league play, hosting 1948 home games at Weaver Field. The Dukes ended the season a distant 8th place in the North Atlantic League, finishing 54.0 games behind the 1st place Peekskill Highlanders and 19.5 games behind the 7th place Nyack Rockies. In the North Atlantic League regular season, Lansdale had a record of 28–101, playing the season under managers William Leary, Whitey Mellor and Lawrence Glick. The 1948 total Lansdale home attendance was 14,400.

The Lansdale Dukes franchise folded after the 1948 season and Lansdale has not hosted another minor league team.

The ballpark
The 1948 Lansdale Dukes reportedly played minor league home games at Weaver Field in Memorial Park. First constructed in 1921, the ballpark had a capacity of 2,000 and was named for Joseph K. "Dobbie" Weaver, a coach and counselor. Located at 300 East Main & South Line Street in Lansdale, Pennsylvania, the park is still in use today.

Year–by–year record

Notable alumni
Tony Parisse (1948)

References

External links
Baseball Reference
Weaver Field photos

Defunct minor league baseball teams
Professional baseball teams in Pennsylvania
Defunct baseball teams in Pennsylvania
Baseball teams established in 1948
Baseball teams disestablished in 1948
North Atlantic League teams
Lansdale, Pennsylvania